Neal Blaney (5 November 1889 – 30 October 1948) was an Irish Fianna Fáil politician, and long-serving member of the Oireachtas.

Neal Blaney was born in Rosnakill, County Donegal, the fifth of six children of William Blaney, a small farmer, and Anna Blaney (née Sweeney). In 1913 Blaney joined the Irish Volunteers in Rosnakill and in 1914 was appointed company captain. He was the first president of the Rosnakill branch of Sinn Féin (founded 1916), and was active in Joseph O'Doherty's 1918 general election campaign. In 1920 he was appointed officer in charge of the Fanad Battalion, 1st Northern Division of the Irish Republican Army. During the Irish Civil War, Blaney was second-in-command of Anti-Treaty IRA Donegal no. 2 Brigade before being captured by Free State forces in December 1922. His death sentence for possession of a firearm was commuted after the ceasefire order, and he was released in July 1924.

He was first elected as a Teachta Dála (TD) to the 5th Dáil for the Donegal constituency at the June 1927 general election. He retained his seat at subsequent general elections until it was abolished in boundary changes for the 1937 general election when he was returned for the new Donegal East constituency. He lost his seat at the 1938 general election, and was elected to the 3rd Seanad on the Agricultural Panel, serving until 1943.

He returned to 11th Dáil at the 1943 general election, and was re-elected at the 1944 general election. In early October 1948 he was diagnosed as suffering from cancer, and died on 30 October 1948, after being returned to the 13th Dáil at the 1948 general election. In the resulting by-election on 7 December 1948, his son Neil Blaney was elected as the new TD for Donegal East.

Blaney was a director of the Milford Bakery Company, and also of the Donegal Bacon Company, Letterkenny, which he was instrumental in founding.

Another son, Harry Blaney, and Harry's son Niall Blaney, were later elected as TDs for the Donegal North-East constituency.

See also
Families in the Oireachtas

References

1889 births
1948 deaths
Neal
Fianna Fáil TDs
Members of the 5th Dáil
Members of the 6th Dáil
Members of the 7th Dáil
Members of the 8th Dáil
Members of the 9th Dáil
Members of the 3rd Seanad
Members of the 11th Dáil
Members of the 12th Dáil
Members of the 13th Dáil
Fianna Fáil senators